Eichendorff-Literaturpreis is a literary prize of Germany. It was first awarded in 1956 and was created in honour of Joseph Freiherr von Eichendorff. The prize, endowed with 5,000 euros, has been awarded annually by the Wangener Kreis – Society for Literature and Art of the East. The award goes to writers who are closely related to Silesian culture.

Recipients 

1956 Ernst Günther Bleisch
1958 Reiner Zimnik
1960 Kurtmartin Magiera
1961 Jürgen von Teichmann
1962 Hans-Christian Kirsch
1963 Jochen Hoffbauer, Dagmar von Mutius
1964 Egon H. Rakette
1965 Hans Niekrawietz
1966 Dagmar Nick
1967 Ruth Hoffmann
1968 Gerhard Uhde
1969 Hugo Hartung
1970 Hans Lipinsky-Gottersdorf
1971 Heinz Piontek
1972 Kurt Heynicke
1973 Josef Mühlberger
1974 Werner Klose
1975 Lutz Besch
1976 Peter Hirche, Friedrich Bischoff
1977 Norbert Ernst Dolezich, Maria Blucha
1978 Monika Taubitz
1979 Peter Huchel
1980 Ilse Langner
1981 Eberhard Cyran
1982 Christine Busta
1983 Ruth Storm
1984 Reiner Kunze
1985 Dietmar Scholz
1986 Peter Lotar
1987 Dietmar Grieser
1988 Richard Wolf
1989 Walter Neumann
1990 Otfried Preußler
1991 Eva Zeller
1992 Christian Saalberg
1993 Bodo Heimann
1994 Bernd Jentzsch
1995 Werner Heiduczek
1996 Peter Horst Neumann
1997 Armin Müller
1998 Ilse Tielsch
1999 Barbara von Wulffen
2000 Peter Härtling
2001 Werner Dürrson
2002 Urszula Kozioł
2003 Günter de Bruyn
2004 Wulf Kirsten
2005 Uwe Grüning
2006 Hans-Ulrich Treichel
2007 Renata Schumann
2008 Günther Schiwy (postum for his biography Eichendorff. Der Dichter in seiner Zeit)
2009 Gerd-Peter Eigner
2010 Christoph Hein
2011 Jörg Bernig
2012 Catalin Dorian Florescu
2013 Ulrich Schacht
2014 Adam Zagajewski
2015 Nico Bleutge
2016 Christian Lehnert
2017 Michael Krüger
2018 Kerstin Preiwuß
2019 Christa Ludwig
2020 Saša Stanišić for Herkunft
2021 Iris Wolff
2022 Joanna Bator

References

External links
 

German literary awards
Awards established in 1956
1956 establishments in Germany